Bethanie Mattek-Sands and Lucie Šafářová defeated Chan Yung-jan and Zheng Jie in the final, 6–4, 7–6(7–5), to win the women's doubles tennis title at the 2015 Australian Open. Mattek-Sands and Šafářová were playing for the first time as a team in a tournament and each won their first Grand Slam women's doubles title. The victory made them the first new pairing to win the women's doubles tournament at the Australian Open since 2005, as well as the first to win a Grand Slam women's doubles title since the 2007 US Open. After defeating five seeded pairings en route to the win, they became the first unseeded women's doubles duo to clinch the title at the Australian Open since 2012.

Sara Errani and Roberta Vinci were the two-time defending champions, but they lost to Julia Görges and Anna-Lena Grönefeld in the third round.

Seeds

Draw

Finals

Top half

Section 1

Section 2

Bottom half

Section 3

Section 4

References

External links
 2015 Australian Open – Women's draws and results at the International Tennis Federation

Women's Doubles
Australian Open (tennis) by year – Women's doubles
2015 in Australian women's sport